Vanda Dignani Grimaldi (25 July 1930 – 18 April 2019) was an Italian politician. She was a member of the Chamber of Deputies for the Italian Communist Party and the Democratic Party of the Left. She was the first blind person to serve in the Italian parliament.

Early life 
Dignani Grimaldi was born on 25 July 1930 in San Severino Marche, Macerata. She had a sister, Ivana, and she was married to Luigi Grimaldi. She received a university degree in philosophy and worked as a teacher. She was president of the provincial section of the Italian Union of Blind and Partially Sighted People.

Political career 
Dignani Grimaldi was elected as a councillor of Macerata in 1990 and re-elected in 1995. She also served as the municipal health councillor for four years.

She was first elected to the Chamber of Deputies on 5 July 1983 as a representative for the Ancona-Pesaro-Macerata-Ascoli Piceno district in the 1983 general election. She was a member of the Italian Communist Party (PCI). She served as a member on the committee of internal affairs. She was the first blind person to serve in the Italian parliament. Dignani Grimaldi was re-elected in the 1987 general election on 26 June 1987 as a member of the PCI, but she changed parties to become a member of the Democratic Party of the Left (PDS) on 13 February 1991 when the PCI was dissolved. She was a member of the PDS for the remainder of her term in office. She was appointed as a member of the committee of social affairs. She left office on 22 April 1992.

Later life 
Dignani Grimaldi died on 18 April 2019 in Matelica, at the age of 88.

References 

1930 births
2019 deaths
People from the Province of Macerata
Deputies of Legislature IX of Italy
Deputies of Legislature X of Italy
Italian Communist Party politicians
Democratic Party of the Left politicians
20th-century Italian politicians
20th-century Italian women politicians